Royal Air Force Melbourne or more simply RAF Melbourne is a former Royal Air Force station used during the Second World War. Located  to the south-west of Pocklington, Yorkshire, England. The nearest village is Seaton Ross.

History

East Common just outside the village of Seaton Ross was requisitioned for use as a grass airfield in November 1940. In late 1940 the airfield was used by Armstrong Whitworth Whitleys of 10 Squadron as a relief landing ground for RAF Leeming. The airfield soon closed for re-development as a standard RAF Bomber Command airfield with three concrete runways and three hangars.

The first user of the re-built airfield was again 10 Squadron but by this time operating the Handley Page Halifax four-engined heavy bomber, little time was wasted before the aircraft were used on operational sorties from Melbourne. The squadron continued with operation until March 1945 and lost 109 aircraft on operations.

Melbourne was one of seventeen sites equipped with FIDO fog dispersant system. This made the airfield a popular diversion for other squadrons returning from operations to Yorkshire in extreme bad weather conditions.

In May 1945 the airfield was transferred to RAF Transport Command and 575 Squadron moved in with the Douglas Dakota. The squadron only stayed for a few months operating transport flight to and from continental Europe. With the departure of the Dakota a number of specialised Flights used the airfield for six months but by the middle of 1946 the airfield was no longer used for flying.

RAF units and aircraft

Other units:
 No. 4 Group Communication Flight RAF (1945–1946)
 No. 91 Maintenance Unit RAF (1949–1954)
 No. 10 Conversion Flight RAF
 No. 1658 Heavy Conversion Unit RAF
 No. 2820 Squadron RAF Regiment
 No. 4275 Anti-Aircraft Flight RAF Regiment
 Aircrew Testing and Grading Unit RAF
 Transport Command Aircrew Examining Unit RAF

Current use
The site was used for a farmers market in the 1970s, but was gradually adapted into a racing track. Until 2017 the airfield was home to York Raceway running drag racing throughout the summer. York Raceway did not operate at Melbourne in 2018 or 2019. After a fundraising effort a new drag strip was laid and drag racing returned to Melbourne in August 2020. The airfield strip is now home to Melbourne Raceway running drag racing under the organisation of Straightliners. The runway is also used for flying by Pocklington Gyroplane School for Saturday afternoon meets.

References

Citations

Bibliography

External links

RAF Melbourne
York Raceway

[[Drag racing venues in Europe]]
Royal Air Force stations in Yorkshire
Royal Air Force stations of World War II in the United Kingdom
Transport in the East Riding of Yorkshire